Aquarian may refer to:
Aquarius (astrology), a sign of the zodiac
Aquarian Tabernacle Church, a Wiccan church in Index, Washington, U.S.
The Aquarian Weekly, a weekly newspaper in New Jersey, U.S.
Aquarii, Christians who substituted water for wine in the eucharist
The Aquarians, a 1970 American television action film
 The Aquarians, an alternate title for the 1970 film Ghetto Freaks
 The Aquarians, a band with Razzy Bailey

See also
Aquarian Age (disambiguation)
Aquarius (disambiguation)
The Aquarian Gospel of Jesus the Christ, a 1908 book by Levi H. Dowling
Aquarian illusion, a metamorphosis (illusion)
Soulquarians, a band
Wundarr the Aquarian, a fictional character in Marvel comics